Güzelyalı is a station on the Konak Tram line in İzmir, Turkey. Originally named Göztepe, it is located along Mustafa Kemal Coastal Boulevard in west Konak. The station consists of two side platforms, one on each side of the boulevard. 

Güzelyalı station opened on 24 March 2018.

Connections
ESHOT operates city bus service on Mustafa Kemal Coastal Boulevard.

References

Railway stations opened in 2018
2018 establishments in Turkey
Konak District
Tram transport in İzmir